The term sixth chord refers to two different kinds of chord, the first in classical music and the second in modern popular music.

The original meaning of the term is a chord in first inversion, in other words with its third in the bass and its root a sixth above it. This is how the term is still used in classical music today, and in this sense it is called also a chord of the sixth. A first-inversion C major chord is shown below.

 	 

In modern popular music, a sixth chord is any triad with an added sixth above the root as a chord factor. This was traditionally (and in classical music is still today) called an added sixth chord or triad with added sixth since Jean-Philippe Rameau (sixte ajoutée) in the 18th century. It is not common to designate chord inversions in popular music, so there is no need for a term designating the first inversion of a chord, and so the term sixth chord in popular music is a short way of saying added sixth chord. When not otherwise specified, it usually means a major triad with an added major sixth interval (a major sixth chord), such as the chord below.
 	 

However, a minor triad is also used, together with the same interval, resulting in a minor sixth chord (also known as minor major sixth).

History

In early music, what is today called a sixth chord or first inversion in classical music was considered an autonomous harmonic entity with the root named by the bass, while it was later simply considered an inversion of a chord with the bass being the third (not the root) and the root being the sixth (not the bass). In jazz, this form is referred to as a major sixth chord.

Alternatively, rather than as a six three chord, the note may be analyzed as a suspension or appoggiatura, "first resolved and later... retained as a part of the chord, no resolution taking place."

 	 

The dominant chord's fifth may be substituted by the chord's sixth, analyzed as its thirteenth:

 	 

What in popular music is called a sixth chord was traditionally called an "added sixth chord". As the name suggests, this is a triad with an added sixth interval. It is generally built on the subdominant note, though it can be built on any note. Typically, the triad is a major triad and the additional sixth interval is major (major sixth chord). For example, a major sixth chord built on C (denoted by C6, or CM6) consists of the notes C, E, G, and the added major sixth A.

 	 

These are the same notes as those of an A minor seventh chord – whether such a chord should be regarded as an added sixth chord or a seventh depends on its context and harmonic function. To explain the analyses as added sixth chords, against common practice period theory, provides the example of the final tonic chord of some popular music being traditionally analyzable as a "submediant six-five chord" (added sixth chords by popular terminology), or a first inversion seventh chord (possibly the dominant of the mediant V/iii). According to the interval strengths of the added sixth chord, the root of the strongest interval of the chord in first inversion (CEGA), the perfect fifth (C–G), is the root (C).

In jazz, the minor sixth chord (sometimes: minor major sixth, or minor/major sixth) is frequently used. It is unlike the major sixth chord, which is often substituted for a major triad; the minor sixth plays a number of different harmonic roles. The chord consists of a minor triad with a tone added a major sixth above the root. Thus in C, it contains the notes C, E, G, and A.

 	 

This chord might be notated Cm6, CmM6, Cmin/maj6, Cmin(maj6), etc. Note that Cm6 has the same notes as F9 with the root omitted, i.e. the notes F (omitted), A, E, C, and G.

It also shares identity as an inversion of the half-diminished seventh chord.  In the opening section of his Fantasy-Overture, Romeo and Juliet, Tchaikovsky uses the minor sixth chord to striking effect:

These notes form a tetrad with several enharmonic equivalents: C–E–G–A might be written as Cm6, F9, F9 (no root), Am75, B79, AMaj79, or Balt. Many jazz chord charts use these chord notations indiscriminately, particularly in the choice of minor sixth versus dominant ninth chords. Thus, in some cases when a Cm6 is indicated, the F9 is in fact a better harmonic choice, i.e. closer to the composer's harmonic intent; or vice versa. Analysis of the movement of the root, in the presence of dominant-functioning harmonies, will generally indicate which enharmonic chord is the appropriate notation choice. In some cases, the harmony is ambiguous.

In popular music

Instances of the sixth chord crop up in popular music towards the end of the 19th century, for example in Johann Strauss II’s "The Blue Danube" waltz. Richard Taruskin sees Strauss’s use of the added sixth chord as the “one stylistic idiosyncrasy… that went from him into the general idiom of European (or European-style) music, and that is the freedom with which the sixth degree of the scale is harmonized.”  
The sixth chord was a common feature of the harmony of jazz and popular music during the entire twentieth century.  One of the attractions of the chord is its tonal ambiguity.  The harmony contains within it aspects that are both major and minor.  Kurt Weill’s song "Mack the Knife" from the Threepenny Opera (1928) uses the chord from the start, resulting in "a sort of bitonality: A minor in the melody, C major in the harmony."

The trombone riff that opens Glenn Miller’s "Tuxedo Junction" (1940) is a well-known example from the Swing era. Later popular songs that feature sixth chords include: The Beatles' "She Loves You" (1963), "Help!" (1965)  and "The Fool on the Hill" (1967), Arthur Kent and Sylvia Dee's "Bring Me Sunshine" (1968), The Young Rascals' "Groovin'" (1967), Queen's "Bohemian Rhapsody" (1975), Steely Dan's "Bad Sneakers" (1975) and Styx's "Babe" (1979).

In classical music
An unusual use of this chord at the start of a work occurs in Beethoven’s Piano Sonata in E major, Op 31 No. 3 (1802):
According to Denis Matthews, "the most striking moment in the sonata is its opening, where an ambiguous added-sixth chord on the subdominant resolves itself through a series of halting steps, rhythmically and harmonically, towards the tonic."
Debussy frequently used the sixth chord, for example in his piano prelude General Lavine-Eccentric (1913), whose idiom alludes to the popular idioms of cakewalk and ragtime of the early 1900s.  The following passage "is in F major; its seeming pentatonicism (C–D–F–G–A) is found to be the outline of the tonic added sixth chord, plus the G as passing tone…" Maurice Ravel’s 1920 ballet La Valse, which contains subtle echoes of the late 19th century Viennese Waltz, incorporates added sixth chords in its harmony:

The timeless, meditative closing bars of Gustav Mahler’s song "Abschied" from Das Lied von der Erde (1909) fully exploit the expressive power and ambiguity of the sixth chord.  "The final sonority, the famous added-sixth chord, is particularly ingenious... because it fuses the two principal keys of Das Lied (A minor and C major)."

Alban Berg’s Violin Concerto (1935) ends with a "tonic triad of B flat, with added sixth  [that] follows a harmonic progression found frequently in 1930s dance-band arrangements." However, Richard Taruskin points out that Berg's "chord thus created, B flat, D, F, G had an important poetic resonance", as it echoes the ending of Mahler's "Abschied." Stravinsky’s Symphony in Three Movements (1945) "incorporates elements of American popular music, most famously the final chord, a Hollywood added-sixth chord of ever there was one." (Stravinsky himself later criticized his choice of the final D sixth chord as ‘commercial.’ ) Messiaen’s "Louange à l’immortalité de Jésus", the final movement of his Quartet for the End of Time (1941) opens with a meditative theme "played entirely over a 6-4 chord with added sixth"

Special kinds of sixth chords
The Neapolitan sixth is the first inversion of a major triad built on the flattened supertonic (second degree of the scale) – a Neapolitan sixth in C major, therefore, consists of the notes F, A, and D.

 	 

There are a number of augmented sixth chords. Each of them has a major third and augmented sixth above the bass. When these are the only three notes present, the chord is an Italian sixth; when an augmented fourth is added above the bass, the chord is a French sixth; while adding a perfect fifth above the bass of an Italian sixth makes it a German sixth (the etymology of all these names is unclear).

Sixth factor
The sixth factor of a chord is six scale degrees above the root. Conventionally, the sixth is third in importance to the root, fifth, and third, being an added tone. It is generally not allowed as the root since that inversion resembles a seventh chord on the sixth rather than an added tone on the original note. In jazz chords and theory, the sixth is required due to it being an added tone.

The quality of the sixth may be determined by the scale or may be indicated. For example, in a major scale, a diatonic sixth added to the tonic chord will be major (C–E–G–A) while in minor it will be minor (C–E–G–A).

The sixth is octave equivalent to the thirteenth. If one could cut out the notes in between the fifth and the thirteenth and then drop the thirteenth down an octave to a sixth, one would have an added sixth chord (C–E–G–B–D′–F′–A′ minus B–D′–F′ = C–E–G–A).

See also
6/9 chord
thirteenth chord

References

External links 
 

Chord factors
Chords
Chromaticism